Peštalevo is a village located in a lowland area in the municipality of Dolneni, North Macedonia.

History and Demographics
The village traditionally contains a Macedonian Muslim (Torbeš) population that speaks the Macedonian language, descended from three brothers (Abdul, Sinan and Suljo). The three siblings originated from one of the Muslim Slavic villages in the Debar region (now on the modern Albanian side of the border) arriving to Peštalevo in the second half of the 18th century. Macedonian Muslims of Peštalevo are divided into many households split into three groups referred to by patronyms based on their ancestors (Abdulovci, Sinanovci and Suljovci). Between 1954 - 1960 large scale migration from Peštalevo by Macedonian Muslims to Turkey occurred, while Orthodox Macedonians from the Poreče region settled in the village. The village also contains residents originating from the village of Brailovo. Macedonian Muslims from Peštalevo refer to the surrounding Christian population as Makedonci (Macedonians) and those Orthodox Macedonians refer to them as Turci (Turks) due to they being Muslims. The village also has an ethnic Albanian population. 

According to the 2021 census, the village had a total of 511 inhabitants. Ethnic groups in the village include:

Macedonians 254
Albanians 119
Turks 93
Serbs 1
Bosniaks 30
Others 14

References

Villages in Dolneni Municipality
Albanian communities in North Macedonia
Macedonian Muslim villages